Pregnanetriolone, or 11-ketopregnanetriol, is a steroid hormone.

Clinical significance
There is no or little excretion of pregnanetriolone in the urine in healthy people. In patients with congenital adrenal hyperplasia due to 21-hydroxylase deficiency, the daily excretion exceeds 100 μg. ACTH stimulation increased excrement even further. It has been concluded since at least 1974 that the excretion of pregnenolone in urine after ACTH stimulation test can help detect heterozygous carriers of congenital adrenal hyperplasia caused by 21-hydroxylase deficiency. These conclusions were confirmed by later studies.

See also
 Pregnanetriol

References

5β-Pregnanes
Human metabolites